Davíð Arnar Ágústsson (born 5 November 1996) is an Icelandic basketball player who plays for Úrvalsdeild karla club Þór Þorlákshöfn. Nicknamed Dabbi Kóngur (English: King Dabbi), he helped Þór Þorlákshöfn win its first ever national championship in 2021.

Club career
After starting his senior team career during the 2012–13 season, Davíð first made the spotlight after starting the 2015–16 season by making 14 out of his first 19 three point shots, earning him the nickname Dabbi Kóngur. On 22 October 2015 when made seven out of eight three point shots, on his way to 21 points, in a victory against Tindastóll. Two games later, he made five out of seven three point shots in a victory against ÍR.

Davíð helped Þór to the Icelandic Cup finals in both 2016 and 2017, where they lost to KR both times. Both years, Þór also faced KR in the Icelandic Super Cup, winning both times.

After being expected to battle relegation, Þór started the 2020–21 season hot and finished second in the league, behind powerhouse Keflavík. They then went on to beat Þór Akureyri and Stjarnan in the first two rounds of the playoffs, before unexpectedly beating favourites Keflavík 3–1 in the Úrvalsdeild finals. In the championship clinching game, Davíð made five out of seven three point shots, scoring 15 points, as well as keeping Keflavík's star Deane Williams in check on defense.

On 2 October 2021, he scored 12 points in Þór's 113–100 win against Njarðvík in the Icelandic Super Cup.

National team career
In July 2021, Davíð Arnar was selected to the Icelandic national team for the first time.

Awards and honours
 Icelandic championship: 2021
 Icelandic Super Cup (3): (2016, 2017, 2021)

References

External links
Icelandic statistics at Icelandic Basketball Association

1996 births
Living people
Forwards (basketball)
Davíð Arnar Ágústsson
Davíð Arnar Ágústsson
Davíð Arnar Ágústsson